Extreme Hearts is an original Japanese anime television series created and written by Masaki Tsuzuki, the creator of Magical Girl Lyrical Nanoha and Dog Days, directed by Junji Nishimura and animated by Seven Arcs, which aired from July to September 2022.

Characters

She is a high school student and a guitarist. Although she already made her solo debut, her career remained unsuccessful, leading to her label ending her contract. Not wanting to give up on music, her fan Saki introduced her to Extreme Hearts, a sports competition for idol groups.

A high school student and a fan of Hiyori's music. She has played football from a young age.

A high school student and a former baseball player. She is Saki's childhood friend.

A high school student. Her family runs a dojo. Much is expected from her as her father and brother both died in an accident prior to the events of the series.

A high school student and karateka. She uploads her moves online but hasn't been able to gain much of a following. She retired from karate competitions due to an incident where she accidentally injured an opponent, which continued to haunt her until she was recruited by RISE.

RiN

NaO

SaKo

Production and release
The original project created by Masaki Tsuzuki was originally announced on May 20, 2021, which was later revealed to be an anime television series on February 10, 2022. Junji Nishimura is directing the anime at Seven Arcs, with Tsuzuki writing the scripts, and Effy composing the music. Original character designs are provided by Waki Ikawa, while Issei Aragaki adapts the designs for animation. Aragaki and Kana Hashidate are serving as chief animation directors, and Shuichi Kawakami and Takuya Fujima drafted the sub-character designs. The series aired from July 10 to September 25, 2022, on Tokyo MX and BS11. The opening theme song is "Infinite" by Miho Okasaki. Crunchyroll licensed the series outside of Asia.

Episode list

Notes

References

External links
 Anime official website 
 

Anime with original screenplays
Crunchyroll anime
Seven Arcs
Sports anime and manga
Tokyo MX original programming